MS Pride of Kent is a cross-channel ferry operated by P&O Ferries, which since 2003 has operated on the Dover to Calais route. Before that, between 1992 and 2002, it had operated on the Dover to Zeebrugge route.

History
Originally built as European Highway in 1991 and was a sister ship to Pride of Canterbury, and European Seaway. Originally servicing Zeebrugge, like Pride of Canterbury, she was converted in 2003 before re-entering service on the Dover–Calais route as Pride of Kent.

On 10 December 2017, the ferry ran aground in the Port of Calais during routine departure manoeuvres in high winds. The vessel was later refloated at high tide with assistance from harbour tugs commandeered from the Port of Dunkirk. On 12 December 2017, the vessel made her way to Dunkirk for an emergency dry docking for repairs for a damaged shaft seal and gearbox.

In early 2019, the Pride of Kent, like all P&O vessels on the Dover-to-Calais route, has been flagged out to Cyprus, a measure explained by the company as motivated by tax advantages in view of Brexit. She is currently registered in Limassol.

On 21 March 2022 Transport Secretary Grant Shapps MP announced that he will require P&O Ferries to rename Pride of Kent and other ships on the fleet which carry British names if the company is found to have breached employment regulations following the summary dismissal without notice via Zoom of 800 British seafarers to be replaced with cheaper overseas agency workers. On 24 March 2022, P&O Ferries CEO Peter Hebblethwaite confirmed that the management of the company illegally fired 800 British seafarers so it is expected that this ship will now have to have its name changed as Grant Shapps announced three days previously.

Project Darwin
With the ending of the P&O Stena Line agreement, newly formed P&O Ferries announced that the ex Zeebrügge freight vessels European Highway and European Pathway would be rebuilt at the German Shipyard of Lloyd Werft. On completion of their rebuilds, they would be placed on the premier Dover-Calais service, replacing [[MS Anthi Marina|PO Kent]] (ex-Spirit of Free Enterprise, Pride of Kent, then POSL Kent) and PO Canterbury (ex-). This move became widely known by its P&O in-house code name, Project Darwin. Key features of the converted ships were:
 Passenger capacity up from 200 to 2,000
 More than 5,000 square metres of passenger accommodation
 Fifty extra crew cabins
 Better manoeuvrabilityEuropean Pathway was to leave for Bremerhaven on 1 December 2002, followed later in the month by European Highway. The rebuilt ferries were to enter service in April and May 2003 respectively.

 Seizure by MCA 
On the evening of 28 March 2022, the Maritime and Coastguard Agency announced that the Pride of Kent had been detained at the Port of Dover following an inspection. The ship was declared "unfit to sail" following an inspection that P&O had hoped would allow the ship to sail without passengers or cargo. This followed P&O's sacking of 800 seafarers earlier in the month and replacing the crew with agency staff.

LayoutPride of Kent has six 'active' decks - cardeck 3 freight and cars, cardeck 5 freight and cars, cardeck 6 cars only, deck 7 & 8 passenger facilities and deck 9 outside deck area.  The ship is both divided vertically (as decks) and horizontally, into 3 ventilation zones, with stairs assigned the colours red, yellow, orange, green and blue. There are three passenger lifts from the main and car decks to the passenger facilities. Her onboard facilities include (amongst others) several lounges, a self-service cafeteria, two cafés, a restaurant, and a bar. There are also open decks on levels 8 and 9.

Sister ships

As built, Pride of Kent was identical to European Seaway and European Pathway. The fourth 'European Class' freight ferry was converted to a multi-purpose vessel for the Dover-Calais route and named , though she still retained a number of similarities.
 Pride of Kent and Pride of Canterbury'' are commonly known as the 'Darwin Twins' or 'Darwins' after the project name given by P&O to the conversion of the ships.

References

Ferries of the United Kingdom
Ferries of France
1991 ships
Ships of P&O Ferries
Maritime incidents in 2017